= AFI Awards =

AFI Awards may refer to:

- American Film Institute Awards
- Australian Film Institute Awards, the precursor of the AACTA Awards
